The Marsh–Place Building at 627 Sycamore St. in Waterloo, Iowa is a six-story building built in 1910.  According to its nomination to the National Register of Historic Places, it is notable as "a distinctive, virtually unaltered example of the Commercial Style".  And it is an "excellent" example of "the three-part base-shaft-capital approach (similar to a classical column) to tall building design."

It is a work of architects Hallett & Rawson. It was individually listed on the National Register of Historic Places in 1998. In 2011 it was included as a contributing property in the Waterloo East Commercial Historic District.

References

National Register of Historic Places in Black Hawk County, Iowa
Buildings designated early commercial in the National Register of Historic Places
Buildings and structures completed in 1910
Buildings and structures in Waterloo, Iowa
Office buildings on the National Register of Historic Places in Iowa
Chicago school architecture in Iowa
Individually listed contributing properties to historic districts on the National Register in Iowa